Fotbal Club Vaslui are a Romanian professional association football club based in Vaslui, Romania, who currently are not playing in any league following their relegation from the Liga I due to the financial collapse. They have played at their current home ground, Municipal, since their foundation in 2002. Since playing their first competitive match, more than 200 players have made a competitive first-team appearance for the club, of whom almost 60 players have made at least 25 appearances (including substitute appearances); those players are listed here.

Vaslui's record appearance-maker is Mike Temwanjera, who made 202 appearances between 2007 until 2014. Lucian Sânmărtean has made the second most appearances with 149. 12 other players have made more than 100 appearances for the club. Wesley is the club's record goalscorer; he scored 77 goals in his three-and-a-half years at Vaslui. Wesley is the only player to score more than 50 goals for Vaslui; only three other players have scored more than 25 goals for the club.

Players
Appearances and goals are for first-team competitive matches only, including Divizia A / Liga I, Divizia B, Divizia C, Romanian Cup, UEFA Champions League, UEFA Cup / UEFA Europa League and UEFA Intertoto Cup matches.
Players are listed according to the date of their first team début for the club.
Positions are listed according to the tactical formations.
Statistics correct as of 19 May 2014.

Table headers
 Nationality – If a player played international football, the country/countries he played for are shown. Otherwise, the player's nationality is given as their country of birth.
 Vaslui career – The year of the player's first appearance for Vaslui to the year of his last appearance.
 Starts – The number of games started.
 Sub – The number of games played as a substitute.
 Total – The total number of games played, both as a starter and as a substitute.

Honours as Captain

List of International Players

References 

Vaslui
Vaslui
Association football player non-biographical articles